Gladden Farm, also known as Gladden-Roming Stone House, is a historic home and farm complex located in Street, Maryland. The complex includes three historically-significant structures: a large five-bay rubblestone bank house with Federal detailing, a one-story rubblestone spring house, and a one-story board-and-batten frame shop. 

The first two structures were built around 1820, the latter from the mid-19th century. Some interior details were installed around 1945 from a demolished house on Franklin Street in Baltimore, including a mantel, built-in cabinets, and bookcases. The main room's north wall is paneled with English oak removed from another demolished Baltimore dwelling. The home is named for the locally prominent Gladden family, who were leading and innovative farmers, who saw to it that the Maryland and Pennsylvania Railroad was built through this party of the county, and established a station stop near their farm at The Rocks.

The farm was listed on the National Register of Historic Places in 1993.

References

External links
, including undated photo, Maryland Historical Trust website

Farms on the National Register of Historic Places in Maryland
Houses in Harford County, Maryland
Houses completed in 1820
Federal architecture in Maryland
Street, Maryland
National Register of Historic Places in Harford County, Maryland